Two vessels that served the Royal Navy have been named Duchess of Cumberland:

  was the American privateer Congress, of Beverley, Massachusetts,. Congress was armed with eighteen 9-pounders guns, and had a crew of 120 men.  captured her at some point between 16 June and 2 July 1781. The Royal Navy took Congress in as the 16-gun sloop HMS Duchess of Cumberland, under Commander Edward Marsh. Duchess of Cumberland was wrecked on 22 September 1781 on Cape St. Mary's during a heavy fog. She had been escorting a convoy from Placentia, Newfoundland and Labrador. 
 His Majesty's hired armed cutter .

Footnotes
Notes

Citations

References

Royal Navy ship names